Turkish Armed Forces Medal of Distinguished Courage and Self-Sacrifice is one of the highest medals that can be bestowed upon an individual by the Turkish Armed Forces (TAF) and was created on July 3, 1975.

Technical specifications

General
Silver laurels encircling the gold medal that has an engraving of the Mehmetçik, the legendary and symbolic Turkish soldier, on top.

Decoration (regular size)
Made of three pieces
Metal:    Bronze
Minting:  5 micrometre silver and 0.2 micrometre  gold-plating
Weight:   59 grams
Diameter: 3,5 cm

Decoration (miniature size)
Made of three pieces
Metal:    Bronze
Minting:  5 micrometre  silver and 0.2 micrometre  gold-plating
Weight:   15 grams
Diameter: 1 cm

Ribbon
Color: Red with a golden crescent moon and a star on top

Criteria
During war or peace, it is bestowed on individuals or regiments who have accomplished their missions with great courage and self-sacrifice while risking their lives.

The medal can be given to civilians or soldiers, regardless of nationality. Its bestowment is proposed by either the Deputy Minister for National Defense or by any of the Commanders of the four branches of the TAF, namely the Army, the Navy, the Air Force or the Gendarmerie (with the exception of the Commander of the fifth branch, the Coast Guard). The outcome of any proposition depends on the approval of the Chief of the General Staff.

See also 
 Medal of Independence (Turkey)
 Turkish Armed Forces Medal of Honor
 Turkish Armed Forces Medal of Distinguished Service

References
TAF website with a list of its medals
Turkish Army website with a list of its medals

External links
TAF website in English

Military awards and decorations of Turkey
1975 establishments in Turkey
Awards established in 1975